The 1956 Hong Kong Urban Council election was held on 7 March 1956. The elected seats were extended from four to eight seats and the election was for the 6 of the 8 elected seats of the Urban Council of Hong Kong. 6,040 of the 14,682, about 41 per cent of the eligible voters cast their ballots in this election, highest turnout rate in the history of the Urban Council elections.

The newly established political group Hong Kong Civic Association won two of the six seats while the rest were won by the Reform Club of Hong Kong. The China Mail commented the election as "the first of a genuine 'political contest'" between two parties. Alison Bell, a Scottish-born Hong Kong doctor ran as the candidate for the Reform Club became the first woman to be elected to the council. The four candidates who gained the highest votes would have a three-year term and the other two would have only a one-year term.

Overview
The election was noted by its high turnout and the competition between two political groups for the first time. 6,048 of the 14,682 eligible voters cast their ballots, which consisted of 41.2 per cent of the electorate, which was the highest turnout rate in the history of the Urban Council elections. Many of the voters were Chinese.

The Reform Club of Hong Kong had a decisive victory over the newly established Hong Kong Civic Association which founded two years ago in 1954 by getting all four candidates of its ticket elected, winning four of the six seats. Alison Bell, a Scottish-born Hong Kong doctor ran as the candidate for the Reform Club became the first woman to be elected to the council. Another Club's newcomer was Chan Shu-woon, son of the former Guangdong warlord Chen Jitang. Only Li Yiu-bor and Dr. Woo Pak-foo on the Association's six-candidate ticket were elected, while Oswald Cheung and Hilton Cheong-Leen failed to get elected. It was regarded as "the first time in the Colony's history the election was a 'political' contest between two parties". The Reform Club supporters who favoured block vote, in which over 4,000 out of at least 4,465 voted according to the Club's ticket, contributed to its victory, while the Civic Association lacked the organisational ability of the Reform Club electorate.

Results

Citations

References
 Lau, Y.W. (2002). A history of the municipal councils of Hong Kong : 1883-1999 : from the Sanitary Board to the Urban Council and the Regional Council. Leisure and Cultural Service Dept. 
 Pepper, Suzanne (2008). Keeping Democracy at Bay:Hong Kong and the Challenge of Chinese Political Reform. Rowman & Littlefield.

1956 elections in Asia
1956 in Hong Kong
Urban
March 1956 events in Asia
1956 elections in the British Empire